Lieutenant General Rail Rzayev (March 10, 1945 – February 11, 2009) was the Commander of the Azerbaijani Air Force from shortly after Azerbaijan's independence in the early 1990s, to his death in 2009.

Early life
Rzayev was born on March 10, 1945, in Salyan, Azerbaijan. After completing his secondary education in Sumgayit in 1962, he was enrolled in the Aircraft Electronics and Communication Systems (FRELA) school of the Soviet Aviation Academy named after Orzhenikidze. After graduating from the academy in 1966, he was directed to serve at Baku Air Defense District. In Baku, he worked as the Senior Technician and then served as the Deputy Commander of a Division.
In 1975, he entered the Zhukov Air and Space Defence Academy. Upon graduation he was appointed a Division Commander and from 1980 through 1992, he held several high-ranking positions at various military units of the Soviet Air Force.

Azerbaijani Air Force 
In 1992, Rzayev started his career in Azerbaijani Armed Forces. He was appointed the Chief of Department of Azerbaijani Air and Air Defense Forces. According to the Presidential Decree from 1993, he was appointed Deputy Minister of Defense of Azerbaijan Republic and Commander of Azerbaijani Air and Air Defense Forces, a position which he held until his death in 2009. He was shot and killed outside his Baku home on February 11, 2009.

Ranks and awards
In 1994, Rzayev was promoted to General Major, in 2002 he was given the rank of Lieutenant General. He's credited for his outstanding work in establishing and modernizing the Azerbaijani Air Force. He was awarded with Azerbaijani Flag Order and Veten Ughrunda Medal (In the Name of Motherland)  for service to his country.

References

1945 births
2009 deaths
21st-century Azerbaijani Air Forces personnel
Azerbaijani military personnel of the Nagorno-Karabakh War
People murdered in Azerbaijan
Deaths by firearm in Azerbaijan
Assassinated Azerbaijani people
Recipients of the Azerbaijani Flag Order
People from Salyan, Azerbaijan
Lieutenant generals